Erik Veje Rasmussen (born April 9, 1959) is a former Danish handball player who competed in the 1982 World Men's Handball Championship and 1984 Summer Olympics.

He played club handball with Helsingør IF, and was the top goalscorer of the 1983 Danish Handball League season. In 1984 he finished fourth with the Denmark men's national handball team in the Olympic tournament. He played all six matches and scored 25 goals. Rasmussen played a total 233 games for the national team.

He went on to coach SG Flensburg-Handewitt and Aarhus GF.

See also
List of handballers with 1000 or more international goals

References

1959 births
Living people
Danish male handball players
Olympic handball players of Denmark
Handball players at the 1984 Summer Olympics
Danish handball coaches